Chan Hao-ching and Latisha Chan were the defending champions, but the team withdrew before their second round match.

Hsieh Su-wei and Barbora Strýcová won the title, defeating Gabriela Dabrowski and Jeļena Ostapenko in the final, 6–2, 5–7, [10–2]. Hsieh also regained the WTA no. 1 doubles ranking from Kristina Mladenovic.

Seeds
The top four seeds received a bye into the second round.

Draw

Finals

Top half

Bottom half

References

External links
Main Draw

Qatar Doubles
2020 Women's Doubles
2020 in Qatari sport